The Nirajul Mare is the right headwater of the river Niraj in Romania. It joins the Nirajul Mic in the village of Câmpu Cetății to form the Niraj.

References

Rivers of Romania
Rivers of Mureș County